Sergei Nikolayevich Akimov (born 12 June 1987) is a former Russian professional football player.

Club career
He played in the Russian Football National League for FC Zhemchuzhina-Sochi in 2010.

External links
 
 

1987 births
Sportspeople from Kaluga
Living people
Russian footballers
Association football midfielders
FC Rotor Volgograd players
FC Tekstilshchik Kamyshin players
FC Zhemchuzhina Sochi players
FC Lokomotiv Kaluga players
FC Dynamo Kirov players